This is a list of the main career statistics of Russian professional tennis player Vera Zvonareva. She has won 12 WTA Tour singles titles and reached the finals of the 2008 WTA Tour Championships, 2010 Wimbledon Championships and 2010 US Open. She also was a bronze medalist at the 2008 Beijing Olympics.

Performance timelines

Only Main Draw results in WTA Tour, Grand Slam tournaments, Fed Cup/Billie Jean King Cup and Olympic Games are included in win–loss records.

Singles
Current through the 2023 Miami Open qualifying.

Doubles
Current through the 2023 Dubai Championships.

Mixed doubles

Significant finals

Grand Slam finals

Singles: 2 (2 runner–ups)

Doubles: 4 (3 titles, 1 runner–up)

Mixed doubles: 2 (2 titles)

WTA Finals finals

Singles: 1 (1 runner–up)

WTA 1000 finals

Singles: 7 (1 title, 6 runner–ups)

Doubles: 5 (4 titles, 1 runner–up)

Olympic medal matches

Singles: 1 (bronze medal)

WTA career finals

Singles: 30 (12 titles, 18 runner–ups)

Doubles: 18 (12 titles, 6 runner–ups)

WTA Challenger finals

Singles: 1 (1 runner–up)

Doubles: 3 (1 title, 2 runner-ups)

ITF career finals

Singles: 4 (3 titles, 1 runner-up)

Doubles: 3 (1 title, 2 runner–ups)

Team competition: 2 (2 titles)

Grand Slam tournament seedings
 The tournaments won by Zvonareva are in boldface, and advanced into finals by Zvonareva are in italics.

WTA Tour career earnings
Correct as of the end of the 2021

Head-to-head records

Record against top 10 players

Zvonareva's record against players who have been ranked in the top 10 at some point in their careers (not necessarily when they faced each other). Active players are in boldface.
 Statistics correct .

Wins over reigning world No. 1's

Top-10 wins

Notes

References

Zvonareva, Vera